The 2016–17 Central Coast Mariners FC season was the club's 12th season since its establishment in 2004. The club participated in the A-League for the 12th time and the FFA Cup for the 3rd time.

Players

Squad information

From youth squad

Transfers in

Transfers out

Contracts extensions

Club

Coaching staff

Other information

Statistics

Squad statistics

|-
|colspan="19"|Players no longer at the club:

Pre-season and friendlies

Competitions

Overall

A-League

League table

Results summary

Results by round

Matches

FFA Cup

References

External links
 Official Website

Central Coast Mariners
Central Coast Mariners FC seasons